Eva Fislová (born 17 March 1981) is a former professional Slovak tennis player.

She won one singles title and six doubles titles on the ITF Circuit during her career. On 11 August 2003, she reached her best singles ranking of world No. 98. On 13 September 2004, she peaked at No. 158 in the doubles rankings.

Playing for Slovakia in Fed Cup competition, Fislová had a win–loss record of 0–3.

She retired from professional tennis 2009.

ITF finals

Singles: 7 (1–6)

Doubles: 18 (6–12)

References

External links
 
 
 

1981 births
Living people
Sportspeople from Považská Bystrica
Slovak female tennis players